Eugenia uruguayensis is a species of plant in the family Myrtaceae, native to Brazil though Northeastern Argentina.

References

uruguayensis
Flora of Uruguay